Ouyoun ( translit. al-ʿouyoun) is a village in Mount Lebanon, Lebanon.

Overview
Ouyoun or Aiyoun is a village in Mount Lebanon. It is mostly known for its rolling verdant hills, pine forest trees, water springs, that are vibrant with depth, movement and colors. Its Saint Joseph church inspires reverence and contemplation.

Etymology
The name 'Ouyoun' means springs in Arabic. The name is given because of the many water springs that are there.

Geography 
Ouyoun is located east of Broumana. Area is about 10 km2.  It is located 800 meters(2624 feet) above sea level and 10 miles (16 km) east of Beirut.

Ouyoun's inhabitants are mainly from the Abou Diwan family, with many inhabitants also from the Chakhtoura family.

Demographics
The demographics of Ouyoun are all followers of the Christian faith with majority being the Maronite and Syriac Catholic with minorities being Greek Catholic and Greek Orthodox.

References and footnotes

External links
Aayoun, localiban

Populated places in the Matn District
Maronite Christian communities in Lebanon